The following Union Army units and commanders fought in the Battle of the Wilderness (May 5–7, 1864) of the American Civil War. The Confederate order of battle is listed separately. Order of battle compiled from the army organization May 5, 1864, the casualty returns and the reports.

Abbreviations used

Military rank
 LTG = Lieutenant General
 MG = Major General
 BG = Brigadier General
 Col = Colonel
 Ltc = Lieutenant Colonel
 Maj = Major
 Cpt = Captain
 Lt = 1st Lieutenant

Other
 w = wounded
 mw = mortally wounded
 k = killed
 c = captured

Forces operating against Richmond
LTG Ulysses S. Grant, General-in-Chief, Union Armies

Escort:
 5th United States Cavalry, Companies B, F and K: Cpt Julius W. Mason

IX Corps

MG Ambrose Burnside
 Chief of Staff: MG John G. Parke

Army of the Potomac

MG George Meade

General Staff:
 Chief of Staff: MG Andrew A. Humphreys
 Assistant Adjutant General: BG Seth Williams
 Chief Quartermaster: BG Rufus Ingalls

General Headquarters:

Provost Guard: BG Marsena R. Patrick
 1st Massachusetts Cavalry, Companies C and D: Cpt Edward A. Flint
 80th New York (20th Militia): Col Theodore B. Gates
 3rd Pennsylvania Cavalry: Maj James W. Walsh
 68th Pennsylvania: Ltc Robert E. Winslow
 114th Pennsylvania: Col Charles H. T. Collis

Engineer Troops:
 50th New York Engineers (11 Companies): Ltc Ira Spaulding
 Battalion United States Engineers: Cpt George H. Mendell

Guards and Orderlies:
 Independent Company Oneida (New York) Cavalry: Cpt Daniel P. Mann

II Corps

MG Winfield S. Hancock

Escort:
 1st Vermont Cavalry, Company M: Cpt John H. Hazelton

V Corps

MG Gouverneur K. Warren

Provost Guard:
 12th New York Battalion: Maj Henry W. Ryder

VI Corps

MG John Sedgwick

Escort:
 8th Pennsylvania Cavalry, Company A: Cpt Charles E. Fellows

Cavalry Corps

MG Philip H. Sheridan

Escort:
 6th United States: Cpt Ira W. Claflin (Headquarter)
 8th Illinois (detachment): Lt William W. Long (Third Division)

Artillery
BG Henry J. Hunt

See also
 Spotsylvania Court House Union order of battle
 Cold Harbor Union order of battle

Notes

References
 Rhea, Gordon C. The Battle of the Wilderness May 5–6, 1864. Baton Rouge: Louisiana State University Press, 1994. 
 U.S. War Department, The War of the Rebellion: a Compilation of the Official Records of the Union and Confederate Armies, U.S. Government Printing Office, 1880–1901. Volume XXXVI Part I

American Civil War orders of battle